Aleksandr Viktorovich Uss (born on 3 November 1954), is a Russian statesman and legal scholar who is currently serving as the Governor of Krasnoyarsk Krai since 21 September 2018. He is a member of the United Russia party.

From 1997 to 2018, he was the Chairman of the Legislative Assembly of Krasnoyarsk Krai.

Uss was also a doctor of law, professor, and president of the Siberian Federal University.

Biography

Aleksandr Uss was born in Novogorodka on 3 November 1954 to his father, Viktor (1921 - 2011), and his mother, Maria (1928 - 2017).

Early life and family

His father, a German Russian, was a collective farm chairman, a member of the Hero of Socialist Labor; participant of the Great Patriotic War, has two medals "For Courage". Demobilized in 1947 with the rank of junior lieutenant.

His older brother, Vladislav, graduated from the Krasnoyarsk Agricultural Institute, received an engineering degree.

Education and scientific activity

In 1976, he graduated with honors from the law faculty of Krasnoyarsk State University.

From 1976 to 1980, he was research assistant, postgraduate student at Tomsk State University. In the same place he defended his thesis for the degree of candidate of legal sciences on the topic "Conflicts between convicts accompanied by violent assaults (based on materials from high security penal colonies)".

From 1981 to 1993, he was an assistant, Senior Lecturer, Associate Professor of the Department of Criminal Law, Senior Researcher at Krasnoyarsk State University. From 1986 to 1988, he was a Fellow of the Institute of Foreign and International Criminal Law. with M. Planck based in Freiburg, Germany.

In 1994, at Tomsk State University, he defended his thesis for the degree of Doctor of Law on the topic "Social and integrative role of criminal law" (specialty "Criminal law and criminology; criminal executive law").

Political career

In 1993, he was appointed head of the legal department of the Krasnoyarsk Krai Administration.

In the same year, Uss was nominated as a candidate to the Federation Council from the Evenk Autonomous Okrug.

From 1994 to 1995, he became a Deputy of the Federation Council of the 1st convocation, and a member of the Committee on International Affairs.

From 1995 to 1997, Uss was Deputy Governor of Krasnoyarsk Krai, under Valery Zubov, and supervised public order and legal issues.

On 7 December 1997, Uss was elected a deputy of the Legislative Assembly of the Krasnoyarsk Krai from the electoral bloc "Union of Business and Order - the Future of the Territory". In January 1998 he was promoted as the Chairman of the Legislative Assembly.

Since 1998, by ex officio, he was a member of the Federation Council, and was a member of the Committee on International Affairs.

In March 2001, Uss joined the Unity party.

On 23 December 2001, he was reelected as a deputy, and on 9 January 2002, he was the chairman of the Legislative Assembly of the Krasnoyarsk Krai.

In December 2001, he resigned as a member of the Federation Council in accordance with the law on the new procedure for forming the upper house of the Russian parliament.

In 2002, he ran for the governor of Krasnoyarsk Krai, took first place in the first round on 8 September gaining 27.6% of the vote, and went to the second round. In the second round of elections he won 42% of the votes, but lost to the Governor of the Taymyr Autonomous Okrug Aleksandr Khloponin, with more than 48%.

On 15 April 2007, he was elected a deputy of the Legislative Assembly of the united Krasnoyarsk Krai, and at the first session of the parliament of the united Krasnoyarsk Krai (May 14, 2007), which Uss was the Chairman of the Legislative Assembly of the Krasnoyarsk Krai, (51 out of 52 deputies present voted for his candidacy, as one ballot paper was considered invalid).

Governor of Krasnoyarsk Krai

On 29 September 2017, by a decree of the President of Russia, Uss was appointed as the acting Governor of the Krasnoyarsk Krai.

On 9 September 2018, Uss was elected governor of the Krasnoyarsk Krai, gaining 60.19% of the vote.

He officially took office on 29 September.

Personal life

Uss was married to Lyudmila Prokopyevna Uss (born in 1954), whose his wife is an entrepreneur, and graduated from Krasnoyarsk State University.

They have 2 daughters, Maria Aleksandrovna, (born in 1977), a lawyer by training, and Aleksandra, (born in 1992), and a son, Artyom (born 1982), a lawyer by training.

On 9 October 9 2022 the United States Department of Justice charged five Russians and two oil traders from Venezuela with sanctions for evasion and money laundering. Shortly after, on October 17, Uss's son, Artem, was detained at Milan Malpensa Airport at the US request. Alexander Uss called his son's detention "politically colored".

The total amount of the declared income for 2016 was 24 million 492 thousand rubles, spouses 23 million 781 thousand rubles. Hemp owns Tsentralnoye LLC (a company in Krasnoyarsk; lease and management of non-residential real estate).

The income of the Acting Governor for Uss in 2017 amounted to 221.6 million rubles. He owns one residential building with an area of over 324 square meters, four land plots, four country houses, one utility building and a Range Rover.

Lyudmila in 2017 earned 52.5 million rubles. She owns a residential building, three land plots, three apartments, a garage box, two parking spaces, three non-residential premises, a non-residential building and a bathhouse. She also owns three foreign cars: Land Rover, Range Rover, Lexus GS 300, Silver motorboat, Silverado 31A and a trailer.

At the end of 2018, he is the richest leader of the Russian region. The property of the family of the Governor of the Krasnoyarsk Territory is estimated at 1.5 billion rubles.

According to Uss, the inheritance in the form of real estate and finance was received by him after the death of his parents. The father, Viktor, was engaged in agriculture for many years. From his father Uss passed OOO "Central", a house in Sochi, financially.

References

External links
 Первое заседание I Сессии Законодательного собрания I созыва // Законодательное собрание Красноярского края
 Биография врио губернатора Красноярского края Александра Усса // ТАСС, 29.09.2017
 Александр Усс. Пресс-портрет // RuNews24.ru
 Страница президента на сайте СФУ
 Страница Губернатора на официальном портале Красноярского края

1954 births
Living people
United Russia politicians
Governors of Krasnoyarsk Krai
Members of the Federation Council of Russia (1994–1996)
Members of the Federation Council of Russia (1996–2000)
Heads of the federal subjects of Russia of German descent